Günter Sebert (born 29 May 1948) is a German former football player and manager. He is the former sport director of SV Waldhof Mannheim.

Coaching career
Born in Mannheim, Sebert began his coaching career at Waldhof Mannheim in July 1986 as an assistant coach. He was then promoted to head coach on 17 November 1988 and was in that position until 30 June 1990. He then took over at Hertha BSC on 21 August 1992 and was head coach until 20 October 1993. He was head coach of Stuttgarter Kickers from 2 March 1994 to 30 June 1994. 1. FC Nürnberg was his next destination when he took over on 1 January 1995 and was there until 30 June 1995. He returned to Waldhof Mannheim on 10 October 1996 and was there until 28 March 1997.

References

External links 
 

1948 births
Living people
German footballers
Footballers from Mannheim
Association football defenders
Association football midfielders
Association football sweepers
Bundesliga players
2. Bundesliga players
SV Waldhof Mannheim players
German football managers
Bundesliga managers
SV Waldhof Mannheim managers
Hertha BSC managers
Stuttgarter Kickers managers
1. FC Nürnberg managers
VfR Mannheim managers
SSV Jahn Regensburg managers
SV Sandhausen managers